Francis Chamberlain or Chamberlayne may refer to:

Francis Chamberlain (Australian politician), (1900–1984), Australian politician
Francis Chamberlain (governor), governor of Guernsey
Francis Chamberlayne, MP for New Shoreham

See also
Frances Chamberlain, First Lady of Maine
Frances Chamberlaine, playwright
Frank Chamberlain (disambiguation)